Warm Breeze is a 1980 studio album by Count Basie and his orchestra.

At the 25th Grammy Awards, Count Basie won the Grammy Award for Best Jazz Instrumental Performance, Big Band for Warm Breeze.

Track listing
"C.B. Express" – 6:05
"After the Rain" – 7:15
"Warm Breeze" – 6:45
"Cookie" – 4:01
"Flight to Nassau" – 4:27
"How Sweet It Is" – 7:58
"Satin Doll" – 5:56

All music composed by Sammy Nestico, except "After the Rain" by Nestico and Michel Legrand, and "Satin Doll" by Duke Ellington, Johnny Mercer and Billy Strayhorn.

Personnel
 Count Basie – piano
 Sonny Cohn - trumpet
 Harry "Sweets" Edison
 Willie Cook
 Dale Carley
 Frank Szabo
 Bob Summers
 Bill Hughes - trombone
 Grover Mitchell
 Dennis Wilson
 Mitchell "Booty" Wood
 Danny Turner - alto saxophone
 Bobby Plater
 Eric Dixon - tenor saxophone
 Kenny Hing
 Johnny Williams - baritone saxophone
 Freddie Green - guitar
 Cleveland Eaton - double bass
 Gregg Field - drums
 Harold Jones
 Sammy Nestico - arranger, conductor

References

1981 albums
Count Basie Orchestra albums
Albums produced by Norman Granz
Pablo Records albums
Grammy Award for Best Large Jazz Ensemble Album